Volmer Otzen (3 October 1899 – 26 December 1979) was a Danish diver. He competed in the men's plain high diving event at the 1924 Summer Olympics.

References

External links
 

1899 births
1979 deaths
Danish male divers
Olympic divers of Denmark
Divers at the 1924 Summer Olympics
Divers from Copenhagen